Omiodes fullawayi, Fullaway's banana hedyleptan moth, is a species of moth in the family Crambidae. It was described by Otto Herman Swezey in 1913 and is endemic to the island of Hawaii.

The larvae feed on bananas.

References

Sources

Moths described in 1913
Endemic moths of Hawaii
fullawayi
Taxonomy articles created by Polbot